Paintsville-Prestonsburg Combs Field  is a publicly owned, private-use airport located four nautical miles (7 km) southeast of the central business district of Paintsville, in Johnson County, Kentucky, United States. It is owned by the Paintsville-Prestonsburg Air Board which also serves Prestonsburg in Floyd County, Kentucky. The airport officially opened on August 1, 1964.

Facilities and aircraft
It has one asphalt paved runway designated 13/31 which measures 3,070 by 75 feet (936 by 23 meters).

For the 12-month period ending December 21, 2005, the airport had 5,830 aircraft operations, an average of 15 per day: 3,000 itinerant general aviation, 1,500 local general aviation, 1,300 air taxi and 30 military. At that time there were 10 aircraft based at this airport, all single-engined.

References

External links
 Aerial photo on March 16, 1995 from USGS The National Map via MSR Maps
 

Airports in Kentucky
Buildings and structures in Johnson County, Kentucky
Transportation in Johnson County, Kentucky
Transportation in Floyd County, Kentucky